Ron Perkins is an American actor. He is known for his role as Mendel Stromm in Spider-Man (2002). He also appeared in The Prestige (2006) as the manager of a hotel visited by Hugh Jackman's character in Colorado Springs, as well as nine episodes of Fox TV series House and four episodes of Heroes in 2008.

Filmography

Film

Television

References

External links
 

American male film actors
Living people
Place of birth missing (living people)
Year of birth missing (living people)
American male television actors